Piano Sonata No. 8 may refer to: 
Piano Sonata No. 8 (Beethoven)
Piano Sonata No. 8 (Mozart)
Piano Sonata No. 8 (Prokofiev)
Piano Sonata No. 8 (Scriabin)